The Texas Tech Red Raiders football team captains.

Team captains

See also
Captain (sports)

Notes

References 

Red Raiders
Texas Tech Red Raiders football
Texas Tech Red Raiders football captains